Fred Schultz is an Australian-based designer and entrepreneur in the Tiny house movement. Born in America, Schultz, also an artist and former chemist, moved to Australia in 2001 and designs his houses using the 3D modeling computer program SketchUp.

Schultz's houses appear in the Melbourne-made feature film documentary Small is Beautiful. At screenings of the film in Melbourne in 2015, a tiny house built by Schultz was on display for ticket holders to view.

Schultz designs portable houses specifically for the Australian climate. They include a composting toilet, solar panels, a bath that doubles as a sink, and a kitchen and lounge area.

References

External links 
Company website

Living people
21st-century Australian architects
Year of birth missing (living people)
American emigrants to Australia